Annette Volkamer is a German pianist.

Life and career 
Born in Freiburg im Breisgau, Volkamer studied at the Hochschule für Musik und Darstellende Kunst Mannheim with Paul Dan and Robert Benz as well as at the University of Music and Performing Arts Vienna with Hans Petermandl and at the Juilliard School of Music with Martin Canin. She also attended master classes with Karl-Heinz Kämmerling, Rudolf Kehrer, Michael Ponti, Yevgeny Malinin, Pavel Gililov and Hans Leygraf. In 1998, she won the first medal at the International Piano Competition Maria Canals de Barcelona.

She has participated in radio recordings of the WDR and the SWR and worked with orchestras such as the Konzerthausorchester Berlin, the Staatsphilharmonie Rheinland-Pfalz, the Staatsphilharmonie Krakow, the Philharmonia Hungarica and "I Solisti di Praha". As a soloist, she has performed at venues including the Prinzregententheater Munich, the Konzerthaus Berlin, the Festspielhaus Lucerne, the Romanian Athenaeum and the Krakow State Opera. With the actor Charles Brauer, she created the soiree Beethoven and the Women.

Since 2000, Volkamer has been a lecturer for piano at the Mannheim University of Music and Performing Arts.

Concert critics 

.

Publications 
 CD: Leopold Kozeluch – Musik in seltener Solobesetzung RBM (RBM 463 076)

References

External links 
 
 
 Jagdschlosskonzert mit Charles Brauer

German classical pianists
Women classical pianists
Date of birth missing (living people)
Living people
University of Music and Performing Arts Vienna alumni
Musicians from Freiburg im Breisgau
Year of birth missing (living people)